Unicorns of Love (UOL) is a professional esports organisation founded on 15 August 2013 and based in Hamburg, Germany.

Its League of Legends team competes in the League of Legends Continental League (LCL), the Commonwealth of Independent States' top professional league for the game. The organisation previously had a team that competed in the European League of Legends Championship Series (EU LCS).

Counter-Strike: Global Offensive

History 
UOL announced on 17 January 2019 that it had signed an all-German roster for its inaugural CS:GO team. The team consists of Oliver "kzy" Heck, Markus "maRky" Reitenbach, Andre "Kirby" Kempa, Christian "crisby" Schmitt, and Denim "DeniMM" Ameti.

Final roster

League of Legends

History 
UOL qualified for the 2015 EULCS Spring Split after they defeated Millenium 3-2 in the spring promotion tournament.

UOL then played in the Intel Extreme Masters San Jose tournament. They defeated Lyon Gaming 2-0 in the quarterfinals before upsetting Team SoloMid 2-0 to advance to the finals. There they lost 0-3 to Cloud9, placing second.

Kikis left the team in July 2015. On 13 December 2015 Diamondprox signed with the team. On 27 January 2016, Djoko substituted for Diamondprox for three weeks. On 22 February, Loulex replaced Rudy on the starting roster. On 24 April, Diamondprox left the team.

In early 2019, UOL's application to the rebranded and newly franchised League of Legends European Championship (LEC) was rejected. On 22 May 2019, they acquired the League of Legends Continental League (LCL) spot of Team Just. Their academy team, UOL "Sexy Edition", remained in Germany and played in ESL Meisterschaft.

BOSS, AHaHaCiK, and Nomanz joined from Vega Squadron, which won the 2019 LCL Spring Split, while Innaxe and Edward were acquired from Excel UK and Rogue respectively. UOL finished second in the 2019 LCL Summer regular season, qualifying for playoffs. After defeating Elements Pro Gaming in the semifinals and Vega Squadron in the finals, UOL won their first LCL title and qualified for the 2019 World Championship as the LCL's representative.

UOL has an academy team that competes in the German national league, Prime League Pro Division, called Unicorns Of Love Sexy Edition.

Current roster

References

External links 
 

2013 establishments in Germany
Esports teams established in 2013
Esports teams based in Germany
Counter-Strike teams
League of Legends Continental League teams
Former European League of Legends Championship Series teams